Penicillium glaucum is a mold that is used in the making of some types of blue cheese, including Bleu de Gex, Rochebaron, and some varieties of Bleu d'Auvergne and Gorgonzola.  (Other blue cheeses, including Bleu de Bresse, Bleu du Vercors-Sassenage, Brebiblu, Cambozola, Cashel Blue, Danish blue, Fourme d'Ambert, Fourme de Montbrison, Lanark Blue, Roquefort, Shropshire Blue, and Stilton use Penicillium roqueforti.)

In 1874, Sir William Roberts, a physician from Manchester, noted that cultures of the mold did not display bacterial contamination.  Louis Pasteur would build on this discovery, noting that Bacillus anthracis would not grow in the presence of the related mold Penicillium notatum.  Its antibiotic powers were independently discovered and tested on animals by French physician Ernest Duchesne, but his thesis in 1897 was ignored by the Pasteur Institute.

P. glaucum was found by Pasteur to feed on only one enantiomer of tartaric acid, L-(+)-tartaric acid, which makes its use the earliest example of  kinetic resolution.

References

glaucum
Molds used in food production
Taxa named by Johann Heinrich Friedrich Link